Conrad "Con" Augustus Byrne was a New Zealand rugby footballer who was part of the professional 1907-1908 New Zealand rugby tour of Great Britain.

Early years
Originally from Nelson, Byrne was a farmer by trade. He moved to Wellington in 1906 and joined the Petone club where he impressed in the club competition almost immediately. Byrne was subsequently selected for Wellington and made his debut against Canterbury on August 18 where he scored a try and was part of the side that won the Ranfurly Shield. He played on 4 matches that season against Canterbury, Southland, Wanganui, and Auckland.

Rugby league career
Byrne was selected for the professional All Blacks in their 1907–1908 tour of Great Britain and Australia. Like all players on the tour he immediately received a life ban from the New Zealand Rugby Union. On the tour's return leg Byrne played in the first ever trans-Tasman test which was the début match of the Australia national rugby league team. In the second test against Australia Byrne captained the side to a 24–12 victory that clinched the series. Byrne played in three test matches while on the tour.

In 1908 and 1909 Byrne played for Wellington, including in matches against Taranaki. In 1909 Byrne again toured Australia with the New Zealand side, captaining the side in all three test matches.

In 1910 Byrne joined the North Sydney club in the NSWRL Premiership and later moved to Huddersfield for two seasons, as a forward (prior to the specialist positions of), during the era of contested scrums.

During the 1910–11 Northern Rugby Football Union season Byrne played as a forward, i.e. number 11, in Huddersfield's 8–2 loss against Wakefield Trinity in the 1910 Yorkshire Cup Final at Headingley Stadium on Saturday 3 December 1910.

By 1913 Byrne had returned to New Zealand and was selected to be part of the tour of Australia, playing in his seventh and final test match. He contracted a bad cold on the tour which limited his playing time to just the 1 match. He had played 1 match for the Takaka club on May 10 against Nelson before his selection for the tour and then 1 match for Petone on May 24 against Athletic prior to the departure of the New Zealand team. Following the tour it appears that he stopped playing, aged 29.

Legacy

References

Huddersfield Giants players
New Zealand farmers
New Zealand national rugby league team captains
New Zealand national rugby league team players
New Zealand rugby league players
New Zealand rugby union players
North Sydney Bears players
Petone Panthers players
Wellington rugby league team players
Wellington rugby union players
Rugby league forwards
1884 births
Place of birth missing
1931 deaths